Barbary Sheep is a 1917 American silent drama film produced by Famous Players-Lasky and distributed through Artcraft Pictures, an affiliate of Paramount Pictures. The film was directed by Maurice Tourneur  and stars Elsie Ferguson in her motion picture debut. This picture is said to have George M. Cohan in his film debut as well. It is an adaptation of the 1907 novel Barbary Sheep by British writer Robert Hichens. It was thought to be a lost film until an 8-minute clip or fragment was found in the Gosfilmfond archive.

Plot
As described in a film magazine, following the close of the London social season, Katharine (Ferguson) suggests to her husband that they take a trip to Africa, and when Sir Claude (Hare) learns that there is excellent hunting, the pair book passage. Out in the desert Katharine meets Benchaalal (de Cordoba), who is proud of his conquests of the feminine tourists. In the moonlight of the beautiful desert Benchaalal declares his love for Katharine. Sir Claude, through accident, learns of Benchaalal and returns home unexpectedly from a hunting expedition. Not finding Katharine in the apartment, he becomes suspicious and going out on the mountain sees Benchaalal and Katharine in the desert below. Benchaalal endeavors to take Katharine into his arms, but Katharine frees herself from the undesired embrace. Sir Charles is about to fire upon Benchaalal when the man is killed by a crazed merchant. Reconciliation and a happy reunion take place between Sir Claude and Katharine.

Cast

Elsie Ferguson as Lady Katharine 'Kitty' Wyverne
Lumsden Hare as Sir Claude Wyverne
Pedro de Cordoba as Benchaalal
Macey Harlam as Archmed
Alex Shannon as The old Marabout
Maude George as The innkeeper (credited as Maude Ford)
Frances Ross (uncredited)

Reception
Like many American films of the time, Barbary Sheep was subject to cuts by city and state film censorship boards. The Chicago Board of Censors ordered cut from Reel 3 the scene of a vision of the woman's murder, from Reel 5 intertitles such as "The Arab is faithless - and to satisfy his lust," and from Reel 6 the intertitle "The son of the desert, fired by his passion, scornful of a husband who has kept no watch over his own," and the vision of the woman's murder.

References

External links

Film still at Wisconsin Historical Society
still image
 Hichens, Robert Smythe (1907), Barbary Sheep, a novel, New York: Harper & Brothers, on the Internet Archive

1917 films
American silent feature films
Films based on British novels
Films directed by Maurice Tourneur
Lost American films
Famous Players-Lasky films
Paramount Pictures films
1917 drama films
Silent American drama films
American black-and-white films
Films set in London
1917 lost films
Lost drama films
1910s American films